Roqueredonde is a commune in the Hérault department in the Occitanie region in southern France. Les Cabrils station has rail connections to Béziers, Millau and Saint-Chély-d'Apcher.

Population

See also
Communes of the Hérault department

References

Communes of Hérault